Air New Zealand and its subsidiaries have been involved in several incidents and accidents, including four hull loss accidents.

References

Air New Zealand accidents and incidents